Connétable or Connetable may refer to:

 Connetable (Gatchina), an obelisk and square in Gatchina, Russia
 Connétable (Jersey and Guernsey), elected heads of the Parishes in Jersey and Guernsey islands
 Constable
 Grand Constable of France, the First Officer of the Crown of France